Bruna de Paula (born 26 September 1996) is a Brazilian handball player for Metz Handball and the Brazilian national team. She previously played for Nantes.

She competed at the 2015 World Women's Handball Championship in Denmark.

Individual awards
 MVP of the Pan American Junior Championship: 2016
 Top Scorer of the Junior World Championship: 2016 
 Foreign Handballer of the Year in France: 2016/17
 Top Scorer of the International Tournament of Spain: 2018
 Top Scorer of the Intersport Cup: 2019
 MVP and All-Star Team Best Right Back of the French Championship: 2019/20
 MVP of the EHF European League Final Four: 2021
 Top Scorer of the 2022 South and Central American Women's Handball Championship

References

External links

1996 births
Living people
Brazilian female handball players
Handball players at the 2014 Summer Youth Olympics
Expatriate handball players
Brazilian expatriate sportspeople in France
South American Games gold medalists for Brazil
South American Games medalists in handball
Competitors at the 2018 South American Games
Handball players at the 2019 Pan American Games
Pan American Games medalists in handball
Pan American Games gold medalists for Brazil
Medalists at the 2019 Pan American Games
Handball players at the 2020 Summer Olympics
21st-century Brazilian women